Dan Ouseley (born 18 January 1979 in Paddington) is a British rower.

References 
 
 

1979 births
Living people
English male rowers
British male rowers
People from Paddington
Olympic rowers of Great Britain
Rowers at the 2004 Summer Olympics
World Rowing Championships medalists for Great Britain